Ecuador made its winter games debut at the 2018 Winter Olympics in Pyeongchang, South Korea, from 9 to 25 February 2018. The only competitor was cross-country skier Klaus Jungbluth Rodriguez, who was also the country's flag bearer during the opening ceremony.

Competitors
The following is the list of number of competitors participating in the Ecuadorian delegation per sport.

Cross-country skiing 

Ecuador qualified one male cross-country skier. In 2016 Jungbluth sought and received the help of the Ecuadorian National Olympic Committee to create a ski federation for Ecuador, which allowed him to compete for the country. Jungbluth lives and trains in Mountain Creek, Queensland, Australia.

Distance

See also
Ecuador at the 2018 Summer Youth Olympics

References

Nations at the 2018 Winter Olympics
2018
2018 in Ecuadorian sport